Gazaneh (also Romanized as Gazāneh; also known as Kazūna) is a village in Bala Larijan Rural District, Larijan District, Amol County, Mazandaran Province, Iran. At the 2006 census, its population was 119, in 43 families.

References 

Populated places in Amol County